Goshi Gewog is a gewog (village block) of Dagana District, Bhutan. It also comprises part of Dagapela, along with Dorona and Tashiding Gewogs.

References 

Gewogs of Bhutan
Dagana District